Kingston Secondary School (KSS) is a high school located in Kingston, Ontario, Canada. After the closing of Kingston Collegiate and Vocational Institute, considered the oldest public secondary school in Ontario and the second oldest in Canada, students were phased into KSS. As of 2023, KSS accommodates 1,340 students, with approximately 240 being in middle school and 1,100 in secondary school.

History 
Kingston Secondary School opened to students on December 15, 2020, merging students from the closed Kingston Collegiate and Vocational Institute (KCVI) and Queen Elizabeth Collegiate and Vocational Institute (QECVI). Construction of KSS began in 2017 after the demolition of QECVI that year. The school was planned to be open to students in the 2018–19 school year, though opening was then delayed to 2019–20 school year. Due to the COVID-19 pandemic, the date was further pushed back and the school finally opened in the 2020-21 school year.

References 

High schools in Kingston, Ontario